The Rotten Calder is a river to the east of East Kilbride, South Lanarkshire, Scotland and along with the Rotten Burn it forms the southern and western boundaries of Blantyre.

It begins as the Calder Water at its source at Ardochrig, and is joined by the Cleughearn, Lea and Drumloch Burns around Langlands Moss which drain from the Eldrig Hills. This river has also been titled the 'West' or 'South Calder Water', although the latter title is shared by another river in Motherwell. Upon being joined by the Rotten Burn to the south-east of East Kilbride, the river becomes the Rotten Calder Water. 'Water' is a term used in Scotland to denote a small river.

The Rotten Calder runs through a gorge titled Calderglen, where it flows through East Kilbride Parish. This area of the gorge is under the jurisdiction of Calderglen Country Park, run by South Lanarkshire Council. Over 160 nature trails border the river on both banks, in addition to the forest which occupies the slopes, and ferns, mosses and liverworts on the rocky precipices. European otter, roe deer and European green woodpecker can be seen in the southern reaches of the park. Common buzzards can be seen hunting over open areas by the river and the grey heron, grey wagtail and white-throated dipper are common sights too. The river flows by the site of the former Calderwood Castle (demolished 1947–1951).

The gorge of the Rotten Calder Water was celebrated in books and poems for its grandeur and lush ivy-tied crags. Many traces of 18th- and 19th-century landscape additions can be traced in the park, as well as old mines, quarries, and religious sites. After passing under the General's Bridge at Stoneymeadow, the Water flows by Crossbasket Castle (House) in an easterly direction, and on through the former estates of Greenhall and Milheugh where the valley is seen to give way to wide flood plains.

After Milheugh the river again regains its steep gorge and flows through scenery before flowing into the River Clyde near Bothwell Castle. There are many waterfalls on the river, these are Millwell Linn, Flatt Linn (Crutherland Linn), Torrance Linn (Fairy Linn or Walk Fort Linn), Black Linn, Trough Linn, Calderwood Linn (Castle Falls), Crossbasket Linn, Horseshoe Falls, Old Horseshoe Linn, Small Falls, and Milheugh Falls.

East Kilbride Angling Club have the fishing rights and stock the river with brown trout occasionally but not every year. Permits are available from calderglen visitor centre and the post office at the town centre

The river flows via the north side of Blantyre and forms the eastern boundary of the Newton district of Cambuslang before joining the River Clyde opposite Daldowie.

The valley of the Rotten Calder includes hermitages, islets, caves, crannies, ancient markings, fountains, fairy wells, numerous waterfalls, over 200 nature trails, summerhouses, ruined castles, and steep cliffs.

In addition to Calderglen Park and Calderwood House, the river is referenced in other man-made features near its course, including the Calderwood residential area of East Kilbride, Calderglen High School in the same town, Calderglen House and the former Caldervale village near Blantyre, and Calderside Academy in the same town.

See also 
North Calder Water, flows through North Lanarkshire to the Clyde from near Caldercruix to Daldowie, its mouth on the north bank almost opposite that of the Rotten Calder on the south bank
South Calder Water, also flows through North Lanarkshire to the Clyde from near Shotts to Strathclyde Park

References

Maxwellton and Calderwood Estate, c. 1969–1977, Fred Mitchell Manuscript

External links

Rivers of South Lanarkshire
River Clyde
Cambuslang
East Kilbride
Blantyre, South Lanarkshire